Top Notch Peak is a 10,245-foot-elevation (3,123 meter) mountain summit located in Yellowstone National Park, in Park County, Wyoming, United States.

Description 
It is the 43rd-highest peak within the park. It is part of the Absaroka Range, which is a subset of the Rocky Mountains. The mountain's name was officially adopted in 1930 by the United States Board on Geographic Names. The descriptive name refers to a deep notch near the summit which is apparent from the park road at Sylvan Lake. On August 22, 1970, Dr. Dean Jack Tiller, his wife, daughter, and son-in-law were killed when their small plane crashed into the east face of the peak.

Climate 
According to the Köppen climate classification system, Top Notch Peak is located in a subarctic climate zone with long, cold, snowy winters, and cool to warm summers. Winter temperatures can drop below −10 °F with wind chill factors below −30 °F. Precipitation runoff from the mountain drains to Yellowstone Lake six miles to the west.

Gallery

See also
 List of mountains and mountain ranges of Yellowstone National Park

References

External links

 Weather forecast: Top Notch Peak

Mountains of Park County, Wyoming
Mountains of Wyoming
North American 3000 m summits
Mountains of Yellowstone National Park